Peter Geoffrey Luck (4 August 1925 – 29 June 2015) was a British wrestler. He competed in the men's freestyle lightweight at the 1948 Summer Olympics.

References

External links
 

1925 births
2015 deaths
British male sport wrestlers
Olympic wrestlers of Great Britain
Wrestlers at the 1948 Summer Olympics
People from Rochford